Christine Margaret Hallett,  (born 4 May 1949) is a retired British social scientist, academic administrator, and civil servant.

Biography 
Hallett was born on 4 May 1949 to Richard William Hallett and his wife Gwendoline (née Owen). She studied at Newnham College, Cambridge, graduating with a BA in 1970. In 1994 she completed her PhD in social policy from Loughborough University.

She was Professor of Social Policy (1995–2010), and Principal and Vice-Chancellor of the University of Stirling from 2004 to 2010, the first woman to head a Scottish Pre-1992.

She had previously worked at Department of Health and Social Security, and was then an academic at the University of Oxford, Keele University, University of Western Australia, and the University of Leicester.

In 2002, Hallett was elected a Fellow of the Royal Society of Edinburgh (FRSE), Scotland's national academy.

Selected works

References

 
 
 
 

1949 births
Living people
British social scientists
Women social scientists
Academics of social policy
Civil servants in the Department of Health and Social Security
20th-century British civil servants
Academics of the University of Oxford
Academics of Keele University
Academic staff of the University of Western Australia
Academics of the University of Leicester
Fellows of the Royal Society of Edinburgh